Toarcibatidae is a family of extinct rays that lived in the Early Jurassic in Europe and North America. It includes two genera, Cristabatis and Toarcibatis. This family was originally named "Archaeobatidae", but that name did not conform to the International Code of Zoological Nomenclature so it was replaced. Doliobatis was originally included in this family, but it has since been reassigned to Rhinobatidae.

References

Incertae sedis
Extinct chordates
Prehistoric cartilaginous fish families